Bittacomorphella jonesi, the pygmy phantom crane fly, is a species of phantom crane fly in the family Ptychopteridae.

References

Ptychopteridae
Articles created by Qbugbot
Insects described in 1905